Guglielmo da Leoni (1664 – c. 1740) was an Italian painter and engraver. He was born at Parma. He was reputedly a pupil of Giulio Romano, but he soon abandoned painting for engraving.

References

1664 births
1740 deaths
17th-century Italian painters
Italian male painters
18th-century Italian painters
Italian engravers
Italian Baroque painters
18th-century Italian male artists